Epilepia meyi is a species of snout moth in the genus Epilepia. It was described by Speidel in 2007, and is known from Namibia.

References

Endemic fauna of Namibia
Moths described in 2007
Epipaschiinae
Insects of Namibia
Moths of Africa